Qubuz (also Romanized as Qūbūz; also known as Qūpūz) is a village in Qaranqu Rural District, in the Central District of Hashtrud County, East Azerbaijan Province, Iran. At the 2006 census, its population was 96, in 20 families.

References 

Towns and villages in Hashtrud County